Girgaon Chowpatty (IAST: Giragāva Chaupāṭī), is a public beach along the Queen’s Necklace adjoining Marine Drive in the Girgaon area of Mumbai (Bombay), Konkan division, India. It is served by the Charni Road railway station. The beach is noted for its Ganesh Visarjan, when thousands of people from all over Mumbai and Pune come to immerse idols of Ganesha in the Arabian Sea after the 10 day festival of Ganesh Chaturthi. It is also one of the many places in the city where the Ramlila play is performed onstage every year during Navaratri and an effigy of Ravana erected on the sand is burnt on Vijayadashami at the end of the 10-day performance.

Etymology

Chowpatty is an Anglicised form of Chau-pati (four channels or four creeks in Marathi) as per (Bombay City Gazetteer, I. 27). This name is analogous to that of Satpaty, a village in the Mahim Taluka of the Thane District, which is approached through a Channel or Creek, containing seven divisions of water.

History 

On the road running along the beach, i.e. Marine Drive, the lone surviving terrorist of the 26/11 attacks, Ajmal Kasab, was caught and arrested. A bronze bust of Tukaram Omble, the policeman who helped to arrest Kasab, was erected on 26November 2009.

Pollution

The water surrounding the beach is heavily polluted, and swimming should be avoided. Fecal coliform was recorded in the water in 2013 at levels of 1455 per 100 mL, far above the acceptable standard of 500 per 100 mL. The presence of fecal coliform in the water has been attributed to waste from storm drains, open defecation, and the discharge of raw sewage from sewer pipes not connected to the city mains. 

In 2015, there were reports of deteriorated Ganesha idols washing up on the shore. The idols were found after they were immersed on Anant Chaturdashi day, which heralds the end of the Ganesh Chaturthi festival. The idols that were found were made from plaster-of-paris. It is believed that POP idols cause pollution to marine life. After this, the government ordered only artisan made, clay idols to be immersed, since natural clay deteriorates into the ocean quickly without harming wildlife. POP was banned in Mumbai and most of the Ganesha idols are being made from clay. 

On 30 August 2016, the sand on the beach is said to be turning black due to a possible oil slick in the area. The specific cause of the blackening is unknown.

Images

See also 
 List of beaches in India
 List of tourist attractions in Mumbai
 Tourism in Mumbai

References
 Mumbai attractions, Maharashtra Tourism.

External links 

Beaches of Mumbai